The 1996 Scottish Claymores season was the second season for the franchise in the World League of American Football (WLAF). The team was led by head coach Jim Criner in his second year, and played its home games at Murrayfield Stadium in Edinburgh, Scotland. They finished the regular season in first place with a record of seven wins and three losses. In World Bowl '96, Scotland defeated the Frankfurt Galaxy 32–27. The victory marked the franchise's first World Bowl championship, in its second active season.

The Claymores had gained the right to play as home team in the World Bowl in week 5. They beat the Galaxy 20–0 at the Waldstadion, taking the World Bowl berth as the midseason leaders. This ended an eight-game winning streak from 1995–96 for the Galaxy.

Offseason

World League draft

Personnel

Staff

Roster

Schedule

Standings

Game summaries

Week 1: at London Monarchs

Week 2: vs Barcelona Dragons

Week 3: vs Amsterdam Admirals

Week 4: at Rhein Fire

Week 5: at Frankfurt Galaxy

Week 6: vs Rhein Fire

Week 7: vs Frankfurt Galaxy

Week 8: at Amsterdam Admirals

Week 9: vs London Monarchs

Week 10: at Barcelona Dragons

Notes

References

Scottish Claymores seasons